The year 2008 contained several significant events in spaceflight, including the first flyby of Mercury by a spacecraft since 1975, the discovery of water ice on Mars by the Phoenix spacecraft, which landed in May, the first Chinese spacewalk in September, the launch of the first Indian Lunar probe in October, and the first successful flight of a privately developed orbital launch vehicle by SpaceX's Falcon 1.

Overview
The internationally accepted definition of a spaceflight is any flight which crosses the Kármán line, 100 kilometres above sea level. The first recorded spaceflight launch of the year occurred on 11 January, when a Black Brant was launched on a suborbital trajectory from White Sands, with the LIDOS ultraviolet astronomy payload. This was followed by the first orbital launch of the year on 15 January, by a Sea Launch Zenit-3SL, with the Thuraya 3 communications satellite. The launch marked the return to flight for Sea Launch following the explosion of a Zenit-3SL on the launch pad the previous January during an attempt to launch the NSS-8 satellite.

Five carrier rockets made their maiden flights in 2008; the Ariane 5ES, Long March 3C, Zenit-3SLB, PSLV-XL, and the operational version of the Falcon 1, with an uprated Merlin-1C engine. These were all derived from existing systems. The Blue Sparrow and Sejjil missiles also conducted their maiden flights, and the ATK Launch Vehicle made its only flight, but was destroyed by range safety after it went off course. In November, the baseline Proton-M was retired in favour of the Enhanced variant, first launched in 2007.

The first Vietnamese and Venezuelan satellites, Vinasat-1 and Venesat-1 respectively, were launched in 2008, while a failed Iranian launch was reported to have been that country's first indigenous orbital launch attempt. In September, SpaceX conducted the first successful orbital launch of a privately developed and funded liquid-fuelled carrier rocket, when the fourth Falcon 1 launched RatSat, following previous failures in 2006, 2007, and August.

Space exploration

India launched its first Lunar probe, Chandraayan-1, on 22 October, with the spacecraft entering selenocentric orbit on 8 November. On 16 November, the Moon Impact Probe was released, and crashed into the Lunar surface. Although no other spacecraft were launched beyond geocentric orbit in 2008, several significant events occurred in interplanetary flights which had been launched in previous years. MESSENGER conducted flybys of Mercury in January and October, the first spacecraft to do so since Mariner 10 in 1975. Cassini continued to make flybys of the moons of Saturn, including several close passes of Enceladus, one at a distance of 25 kilometres. In September Rosetta flew past the asteroid 2867 Šteins. On 25 May, the Phoenix spacecraft landed in the Green Valley on Mars, where it discovered water ice. Phoenix exceeded its design life of 90 days, finally failing on 10 November. The Ulysses spacecraft, launched in 1990, was also retired in 2008.

Crewed spaceflight
Seven crewed flights were launched in 2008, one by China, two by Russia and four by the United States. In April, Yi So-yeon became the first South Korean to fly in space, aboard Soyuz TMA-12. On the same flight, Sergey Volkov became the first second-generation cosmonaut. Yi returned to Earth aboard Soyuz TMA-11, which nearly ended in disaster following a separation failure between the descent and service modules, resulting in a ballistic reentry. In September, China conducted its third crewed mission, Shenzhou 7, from which Zhai Zhigang and Liu Boming conducted the first Chinese spacewalk. Soyuz TMA-13, launched in October, was the hundredth flight of the Soyuz programme to carry a crew at some point in its mission.

March saw the launch of the Jules Verne Automated Transfer Vehicle, an uncrewed European spacecraft which was used to resupply the space station. Also in March, Space Shuttle  launched on STS-123 with the first component of the Japanese Experiment Module, the Experiment Logistics Module. STS-123 marked the final flight of the Spacelab programme, with a SpaceLab pallet used to carry the Canadian-built Dextre RMS extension. In November, Endeavour launched on the STS-126 logistics flight, with the Leonardo MPLM.

Launch failures
On 14 March, a Proton-M with a Briz-M upper stage launched AMC-14. Several hours later, on 15 March, the Briz-M engine cut off prematurely during a burn, leaving the satellite in a medium Earth orbit. Following a small legal dispute, the satellite was sold, and raised to a geosynchronous orbit by its manoeuvring thrusters, at the expense of a large amount of its fuel and hence operational life.

On 3 August, SpaceX launched the third Falcon 1. Due to residual thrust caused by the upgraded Merlin-1C engine which was being flown for the first time, the first stage recontacted the second during staging, resulting in the rocket failing to reach orbit. The Trailblazer, PreSat and NanoSail-D satellites were lost in the failure, as was a space burial capsule, containing the remains of several hundred people, including astronaut Gordon Cooper, actor James Doohan, writer and director John Meredyth Lucas and Apollo mission planner Mareta West.

On 16 August, Iran launched a Safir, which though officially successful, was reported to have failed due to a second stage malfunction. The purpose of this launch is in doubt, as before the launch it was claimed that it would place the Omid into orbit, whilst following the launch, it was reported that a boilerplate payload had been launched. Other reports indicated that the launch was only a suborbital test of the rocket. If this was an orbital launch attempt, it was the first Iranian attempt to launch a satellite.

On 22 August, the inaugural launch of the Alliant Techsystems ALV X-1 was terminated 27 seconds after launch from Wallops Flight Facility when it veered off course.  Both hypersonic physics experiments on board were destroyed.

Summary of launches

In total, sixty nine orbital launches were made in 2008, with sixty seven reaching orbit, and two outright failures if the Iranian launch in August is counted. This is an increase of one orbital launch attempt on 2007, with two more launches reaching orbit, which continues a trend of increasing launch rates seen since 2006. The final launch of the year was conducted on 25 December, by a Proton-M with three GLONASS navigation satellites for the Russian government.

Suborbital spaceflight in 2008 saw a number of sounding rocket and missile launches. On 21 February, a RIM-161 Standard Missile 3 was used as an anti-satellite weapon to destroy the USA-193 satellite. USA-193 was a US spy satellite which had failed immediately after launch in 2006.

By country
China conducted twelve orbital launches of a planned fifteen. Europe had intended to conduct seven launches of Ariane 5 rockets, and the maiden flight of the Vega rocket, however payload delays pushed one of the Arianes into 2009, and the Vega was delayed due to development issues. India had originally scheduled five to seven launches, however only three of these were conducted, mostly due to delays with the launch of Chandraayan-1. Japan scheduled three launches for 2008, of which one was launched; an H-IIA with WINDS in February. Russia and the former Soviet Union conducted twenty six launches, not including the international Sea and Land launch programmes, which conducted six. Fourteen launches were conducted by the United States, which had originally announced plans to launch many more, however technical issues with several rockets, particularly the Atlas V, Delta II and Falcon 1, caused a number of delays. The Atlas problems, combined with a series of delays to the launch of NRO L-26 on a Delta IV, resulted in just two of ten planned EELV launches being conducted. Two of six planned Space Shuttle launches were also delayed to 2009, one due to problems with External Tank delivery, and another due to a major systems failure on the Hubble Space Telescope, which it was to have serviced. Israel was not reported to have scheduled, or conducted an orbital launch attempt.

List of launches

|colspan=8 style="background:white;"|

January
|-

|colspan=8 style="background:white;"|

February
|-

|colspan=8 style="background:white;"|

March
|-

|colspan=8 style="background:white;"|

April
|-

|colspan=8 style="background:white;"|

May
|-

|colspan=8 style="background:white;"|

June
|-

|colspan=8 style="background:white;"|

July
|-

|colspan=8 style="background:white;"|

August
|-

|colspan=8 style="background:white;"|

September
|-

|colspan=8 style="background:white;"|

October
|-

|colspan=8 style="background:white;"|

November
|-

|colspan=8 style="background:white;"|

December
|-

|}

Deep Space Rendezvous 

Distant, non-targeted flybys of Dione, Enceladus, Mimas, Tethys and Titan by Cassini occurred throughout the year.

EVAs

Orbital launch statistics

By country

By rocket

By family

By type

By configuration

By launch site

By orbit

See also
 List of human spaceflights, 2000-present
 Suborbital spaceflight in 2008
 Timeline of spaceflight

References

Footnotes

 
Spaceflight by year